Sotiria Koutsopetrou (born 19 August 1979) is a former Greek diver. At the 2000 Summer Olympics, Koutsopetrou competed in the 3 metre springboard event. She also competed in the synchronised 3 metre springboard, along with Diamantina Georgatou, and the 3 metre springboard events at the 2004 Summer Olympics in her hometown of Athens.

References

External links

1979 births
Living people
Greek female divers
Divers at the 2000 Summer Olympics
Divers at the 2004 Summer Olympics
Olympic divers of Greece
Sportspeople from Athens